Eldon Lane is a village in County Durham, in England. It is situated a few miles south-west of Bishop Auckland, a short distance from Shildon. In 2001 it had a population of 394.

References 

Villages in County Durham